Fintan Cullen (born 3 January 1954) in Dublin, is an Irish academic, educator and writer. Cullen is a professor at the University of Nottingham.

National Portrait Gallery Exhibit 
He and Roy Foster co-created the exhibit Conquering England: Ireland in Victorian England, which was in the National Portrait Gallery in London from 9 March 2005 to 19 June 2005. They also co-wrote a book that accompanied the exhibit. The name comes from G. B. Shaw's mordant observation that "England had conquered Ireland, so there was nothing for it but to come over and conquer England."

The exhibition explored the diversity of the Irish in London and their influence in the visual arts, literature, theatre, journalism and politics. It featured  portraits of Shaw, Oscar Wilde, W. B. Yeats and Charles Stewart Parnell.

References

External links
University of Nottingham faculty page

Living people
Irish art historians
Irish educators
Irish scholars and academics
20th-century Irish historians
21st-century Irish historians
People educated at Newbridge College
Academics of the University of Nottingham
1954 births
Place of birth missing (living people)